Razzoq Hamroyev (15 May 1910 – 5 May 1981) was Soviet and Uzbek actor, theater director and pedagogue. People's Artist of the USSR (1969). Laureate of the Stalin Prize, second degree (1948).

Biography 
Razzoq Hamroyev was born on 15 May 1910 in Perovsk. He graduated from school in Tezguzar. After graduating from the Tashkent Male Institute of Education in 1930, he left for distribution to Namangan, where he began to teach the Uzbek language and literature. At school, he organized a drama club, where he was a director and an actor at the same time.

Razzoq Hamroyev died on 5 May 1981 in Tashkent. Buried at the Chigatai Memorial Cemetery.

Family 
 Son - Javlon Hamroyev (1934-1997), actor. People's Artist of the Uzbek SSR (1975).
 Daughter - Guli Hamroyeva (b. 1946), ballet dancer, teacher. People's Artist of the Uzbek SSR (1983).
 Grandson - Bekzod Hamroyev (b. 1960), actor of the Uzbekfilm studio. Honored Artist of Uzbekistan (2012).
 Grandson - Ulugbek Hamroyev (b. 1970), cameraman, clip maker.
 Granddaughter - Nodira Hamroyeva (b. 1985), ballerina. Honored Artist of Uzbekistan (2010).

Awards 
 People's Artist of the Uzbek SSR (1951).
 People's Artist of the USSR (1969).
 Stalin Prize, second degree (1948).
 State Prize of the Uzbek SSR named after Khamza (1964, 1969).
 Order of the Red Banner of Labour (1959).
 Order of Friendship of Peoples (1980).
 Order of the Badge of Honour (1950).
 Order of Outstanding Merit (Uzbekistan) (2003 — posthumously)

References

1910 births
1981 deaths
20th-century Uzbekistani male actors
People from Kyzylorda
Communist Party of the Soviet Union members
People's Artists of Uzbekistan
People's Artists of the USSR
Stalin Prize winners
Recipients of the Order of Friendship of Peoples
Recipients of the Order of the Red Banner of Labour
Soviet drama teachers
Soviet male film actors
Soviet male stage actors
Soviet theatre directors
Uzbekistani male film actors
Uzbekistani male stage actors
Uzbekistani theatre directors